Yeadon Loop station is a SEPTA trolley stop in Yeadon, Pennsylvania. It serves the SEPTA Subway-Surface Trolley Lines 13. Trolleys arrive at this station from Center City Philadelphia and most of them end their routes here. A small commercial storefront containing two local businesses (a mini mart and a Laundromat) can be found inside the loop. Some trolleys continue from there to nearby Darby, Pennsylvania.

External links
 Flickr – SEPTA Yeadon Loop
 Station from Google Maps Street View

SEPTA Subway–Surface Trolley Line stations
Railway stations in Delaware County, Pennsylvania